Municipal Ilopaneco are a Salvadoran professional football club based in Ilopango, El Salvador.
The club currently plays in the Second Division of El Salvador.

Honours

Domestic honours
 Segunda División Salvadorean and predecessors 
 Champions (1) : TBD
 Tercera División Salvadorean and predecessors 
 Champions:(1) : Clausura 2017 
 Runners-up:(1) : Apertura 2016

Current squad
As of 2018:

President

List of Coaches
Ilopaneco has had 4 permanent managers since it first appointed Juan Carlos Reyes as coach in 2014. The longest-serving manager was Guillermo Rivera, who managed Managua for three years from March 2015 to September 2018. Uruguayan Juan Carlos Reyes was the foreign coach in the club. Guillermo Rivera is the most successful manager as he led the club to its first Professional title, the third division title in 2016.
 Juan Carlos Reyes (August 2014 – March 2015)
 Guillermo Rivera (March 2015 – September 2018)
 Salvador Vasquez (September 2018– February 2019)
  Victor Manuel Pacheco (February 2019– present)

External links
 

Football clubs in El Salvador